The 1973 World Wrestling Championships were held in Tehran, Iran. For the first and subsequently the last time Sambo wrestling was included as part of the World Wrestling Championships programme. U.S. National Team included Buck Deadrich, David Pruzansky and Wayne Baughman. Deadrich and Pruzansky both captured bronze medals

Medal table

Team ranking

Medal summary

Men's freestyle

Men's Greco-Roman

See also
 1973 World Sambo Championships

References

External links
UWW Database

World Wrestling Championships
International wrestling competitions hosted by Iran
Sport in Tehran
World Wrestling Championships, 1973
World Wrestling Championships, 1973